Bernard Zuckerman (born March 31, 1943 in Brooklyn, New York) is an International Master of chess.

Zuckerman competed in seven U.S. Chess Championships (1965, 1966, 1968, 1969, 1974, 1977 and 1978), his best result being a tie for fourth place with William Addison in 1965.  He served as a member of the U.S. team in the World Student Team Championships of  1964, 1967 and 1969.  At Brooklyn College, Zuckerman was a prominent player, along with Raymond Weinstein, on its national champion college chess team.  

For more than forty years, Zuckerman was a well-known authority on chess openings.

References

External links

The Chess Games of Bernard Zuckerman

1943 births
Living people
Sportspeople from Brooklyn
American chess players
Chess International Masters
Brooklyn College alumni